Raja Manthiri is a 2016 Indian Tamil-language comedy drama film written and directed by Usha Krishnan and produced by V.Mathiyalagan and P. G. Muthiah Productions. The film stars Kalaiyarasan, Kaali Venkat, Shaalin Zoya and Vaishali. Featuring music composed by Justin Prabhakaran, the film was released on 24 June 2016.

Cast

Kalaiyarasan as Karthik
Kaali Venkat as Suriya
Shaalin Zoya as Subha
Vaishali Radhakrishan as Maha
Bala Saravanan as Satish
Naadodigal Gopal as Sivakumar. Karthik and Suriya's father
Florent Pereira as Subha's father
Saravana Sakthi as Chithappu 
Meenakshi as Karthi and Surya's mother
S. R. Pandiyan as Muneesh, Subha's brother
Gajaraj as Maha's father and drunk astrologer
Supergood Subramani as the alliance broker
Rindhu Ravi
Anandhi
Gunalan

Production
Usha Krishnan, an assistant of Suseenthiran, worked on the film's script in 2013 and selected Kalaiyarasan to play a leading role before he had signed on to star in his breakthrough role in Madras (2014). After being impressed by Usha's commitment as an assistant director, cinematographer Muthiah chose to make Raja Manthiri as his first production. The film was shot throughout the middle of 2015 and had entered post-production by September 2015. The film's release was put on hold for several months until the team could find an apt release date.

Soundtrack
The soundtrack of the movie was  composed by Justin Prabhakaran.

"Kootatha Kootti" — Gnana Anthony Daasan, Reetha Anthony Daasan
"Leguva" — V. V. Prasanna, Sharanya Srinivas
"Snegithiye" — Naresh Iyer
"Ethutha Veetu" — ACS Ravichandran
"Bam Bam" — Chinnaponnu

Release
The film released in June 2016 to mixed reviews from critics. Sify noted the film "is an average entertainer and people, who watch village comedies, might find this as a decent watch", while Behindwood.com added  it "entertains with its comical script and endearing performances by the cast". Baradwaj Rangan of the Hindu wrote "Raja Mandhiri follows the formula where practically nothing happens in the first half, and the big blow-up at interval point is where the story really gets going. But some bits work."

References

External links
 

2016 films
2010s Tamil-language films
Indian comedy-drama films
Films scored by Justin Prabhakaran
2016 directorial debut films